Hamilton's barb (Enteromius afrohamiltoni), also known as the plump barb, is a species of ray-finned fish in the genus Enteromius.

The fish is named in honor of Lt.-Col. J. Stevenson Hamilton, a warden at Kruger National Park, who collected the type specimen.

Footnotes 

 

Enteromius
Cyprinid fish of Africa
Taxa named by Robert S. Crass
Fish described in 1960